26 (twenty-six) is the natural number following 25 and preceding 27.

In mathematics 

26 is the only integer that is one greater than a square (5 + 1) and one less than a cube (3 − 1).
26 is a telephone number, specifically, the number of ways of connecting 5 points with pairwise connections.
There are 26 sporadic groups.
The 26-dimensional Lorentzian unimodular lattice II25,1 plays a significant role in sphere packing problems and the classification of finite simple groups.  In particular, the Leech lattice is obtained in a simple way as a subquotient.
26 is the smallest number that is both a nontotient and a noncototient number.
There are 26 faces of a rhombicuboctahedron.
When a 3 × 3 × 3 cube is made of 27 unit cubes, 26 of them are viewable as the exterior layer. Also a 26 sided polygon is called an icosihexagon.
φ(26) = φ(σ(26)).

Properties of its positional representation in certain radixes 
Twenty-six is a repdigit in base three (2223) and in base 12 (2212).

In base ten, 26 is the smallest positive integer that is not a palindrome to have a square (262 = 676) that is a palindrome.

In science 
The atomic number of iron.
The number of spacetime dimensions in bosonic string theory.

Astronomy 
Messier object M26, a magnitude 9.5 open cluster in the constellation Scutum.
The New General Catalogue object NGC 26, a spiral galaxy in the constellation Pegasus.

In religion 
 26 is the gematric number, being the sum of the Hebrew characters being the name of the god of Israel – YHWH (Yahweh).
 GOD=26=G7+O15+D4 in Simple6,74 English7,74 Gematria8,74 ('The Key': A=1, B2, C3, ..., Z26).
 The Greek Strongs number G26 is "Agape", which means "Love".
 The expression "For His mercy endures forever" is found verbatim in English and the original Hebrew 26 times in Psalm 136. The expression is found once in each of the 26 verses.
 According to Jewish chronology, God gave the Torah in the 26th generation since Creation.

In sports
 The number of complete miles in a marathon (26 miles and 385 yards).
 Effective in 2020, the size of the full roster on a Major League Baseball team, except for regular-season games on or after September 1, when teams expand their rosters to 28 players.
 The number of holes in a floorball ball.
 The maximum capacity of cars allowed to compete in an official Formula One Grand Prix race.

In other fields 
Twenty-six is:
 A 2003 novel by Leo McKay, Jr. The title refers to the number of miners killed in the Westray Mine explosion.

26 is:
The sixth track of After Laughter, the fifth studio album by American alternative band Paramore.
The eighth track of The Balcony, the first studio album by British modern rock band Catfish and the Bottlemen.
In Microsoft Windows list of Alt Codes, the combination + yields the "right arrow" symbol →.
The number of the last letter of the English alphabet, Z.
The name of the Australian alternative rock band, 26.
The number of letters in the basic Latin alphabet, if capital letters are not distinguished from lowercase letters.
The total number of cases on most versions of Deal or No Deal.
Often (in the United States) the number of episodes in a television program each year; this allows one new show per week for half the year, and one rerun per week for the rest of the year.
The alias of punk rock singer Doc Corbin Dart.
The age at which males could no longer be drafted in the United States.
A dice game popular in the Midwest United States from the 1930s to 1950s; players had to roll a chosen number 26 times or more, exactly 13 or fewer than 10.
In a normal deck of cards, there are 26 red cards and 26 black cards.
The number of Cantons of Switzerland.
The number of bones in the normal human foot and ankle.
 XXVI Holdings, Inc, named after the Roman numerals for the number 26, is a holding company that is part of Alphabet, Inc., the structure that ultimately owns Google.
The number of counties in the Republic of Ireland.

See also 
 List of highways numbered 26

References

External links 
 Prime Curios! 26 from the Prime Pages

Integers